Yug Nirman Yojana is an International Social Reform Movement which was started by Shriram Sharma and Bhagwati Devi Sharma.

Idea and Purpose 
It was started for cultural, spiritual refinement and intellectual reconstruction of the world.

Current status 
It movement is currently running in 87 countries and also in some districts of India.

References 

Religious faiths, traditions, and movements